In Greek mythology, Autonous (Ancient Greek: Αὐτόνοος (Auto - Nuss) means 'man with a mind of his own') may refer to two separate individuals:

 Autonous, son of Melaneus and husband of Hippodamia.
 Autonous, an Achaean warrior who participated in the Trojan War. He was slain by Hector just before the Trojans attack the Greek ship's camp in the tenth year of the battle.

Notes

References 

 Antoninus Liberalis, The Metamorphoses of Antoninus Liberalis translated by Francis Celoria (Routledge 1992). Online version at the Topos Text Project.
 Homer, The Iliad with an English Translation by A.T. Murray, Ph.D. in two volumes. Cambridge, MA., Harvard University Press; London, William Heinemann, Ltd. 1924. . Online version at the Perseus Digital Library.
 Homer, Homeri Opera in five volumes. Oxford, Oxford University Press. 1920. . Greek text available at the Perseus Digital Library.

Achaeans (Homer)